Stouthrief (alternatively stouthreif) is the Scottish crime of use or threat of violence against a householder who defends themselves during a housebreaking; it is additional to any associated robbery.

It is to be distinguished from the crime of Hamesucken which is breaking into the home of an individual and assaulting him where that is the initial purpose. Both are crimes at Common Law, typically to be found in the description of the crime libelled in court relative to a single incident rather than in the usually less-detailed newspaper reports of such a trial.

Although rarely used, prosecutions for Hamesucken were brought in 2011, 2015, 2021, and 2022.

References 
 http://www.nls.uk/broadsides/broadside.cfm/id/14713

Scottish criminal law
Scots law legal terminology
Crimes
Theft